Neumann University is a private Roman Catholic liberal arts college in Aston, Pennsylvania.  It is sponsored by the Sisters of St. Francis of Philadelphia.

History
The roots of Neumann University began in 1855 when Bishop (later Saint) John Neumann approved the request of Anna Maria Boll Bachmann to start a religious community of Franciscan Sisters in Philadelphia, Pennsylvania.  Over the course of the next century, the Sisters of St. Francis of Philadelphia grew to the point where they needed a college to assist in their mission of educating and caring for the people in southeastern Pennsylvania and beyond.  Neumann University was founded as Our Lady of Angels College with 115 female students in 1965 by the Sisters of St. Francis of Philadelphia. The name was changed to Neumann College in 1980 in honor of Saint John Neumann, a former Bishop of Philadelphia.

Neumann admitted its first male undergraduate students in 1980. The college was granted approval to offer its first doctoral program (the Doctorate in Physical Therapy) in 2004 and its second doctoral program (an Ed.D. in educational leadership) in 2005. Neumann achieved "university status" from the Pennsylvania Department of Education in 2009.

On June 30, 2021, Dr. Chris Everett Domes, Neumann’s president, and Sr. Mary Kathryn Dougherty, OSF, congregational minister of the Sisters of St. Francis of Philadelphia, signed an agreement of sale for the university to purchase Our Lady of Angels Convent, three smaller buildings, and 63 acres from the Sisters, the congregation that founded the university in 1965.  The land is adjacent to the university’s campus, which almost doubled in size (from 70 acres to 133) with the sale.

Academics
Neumann University is made up of five academic divisions: the Division of Arts and Sciences, the Division of Business and Information Management, the Division of Nursing and Health Sciences, the Division of Education and Human Services, and the Division of Continuing Adult and Professional Studies. Neumann offers graduate degrees in education, educational leadership, physical therapy, clinical mental health counseling, accounting, nursing, business, sport business, athletic training, organizational leadership, and clinical laboratory science. Some programs are offered online.

Neumann University has been expanding into the health care field by introducing new concentrations such as pre-Physical Therapy, pre-Occupational Therapy, pre-Athletic Training as well as introducing a new Health Sciences Major with tracks in exercise physiology and strength and conditioning.  All of these new concentrations will be housed in Neumann's new Health Science Center which is expected to be completed in the fall of 2018. The Health Science Center will contain a state of the art undergraduate nursing teaching auditorium that seats close to 300 students. About 49% of undergraduate students are white, 31% are black, and 9% are Hispanic. Some 65% of undergraduates are female, and 35% are male.  As of fall 2017, about 60% of undergraduates were from Pennsylvania, 16% were from New Jersey, and 18% were from Delaware.

Athletics
Neumann University is a member of the Atlantic East Conference as well as the United Collegiate Hockey Conference (UCHC). It competes in the National Collegiate Athletic Association (NCAA), Division III. In 2009 Neumann University's men's ice hockey team won the NCAA Division III National Championship. In the summer of 2012, Neumann University constructed the Mirenda Center, a 72,000 square foot athletic complex which houses an indoor track, NCAA Division III regulation basketball court, dance studios, student lounges, a classroom, weight and cardio rooms as well as the Center for Sport Spirituality and Character Development.

Neumann sponsors 12 women's athletic teams and 10 men's teams.  In addition the 22 varsity teams, Neumann University also has a very active club sports roster which includes baseball, basketball, cheer leading, a dance team, ice hockey, roller hockey as well as men's and women's rugby.  Most recently, Neumann University won back to back national championships (2015 and 2016) as part of the National Collegiate Roller Hockey Association (NCHRA).

Campus
At Neumann University, there are four residence halls: three on-campus "Living and Learning Centers" plus one nearby apartment complex leased for student housing known as the Buoni Building.

References

External links

Official website

 
Franciscan universities and colleges
Catholic universities and colleges in Pennsylvania
Universities and colleges in Delaware County, Pennsylvania
Association of Catholic Colleges and Universities
Educational institutions established in 1965
Liberal arts colleges in Pennsylvania
1965 establishments in Pennsylvania